Hotwyred was a television show that aired on BET. It debuted on July 10, 2006, replacing BET.com Countdown. The show focused on technology and video gaming, in addition to the latest music videos. The show was hosted by Lamorne Morris and Alesha Reneé, winners from the BET "New Faces" search.

The last episode was aired on May 25, 2007. It was replaced by The 5ive.

BET original programming
2006 American television series debuts
2007 American television series endings